An anna (or ānna)  was a currency unit formerly used in British India, equal to  of a rupee. It was subdivided into four (old) Paisa or twelve pies (thus there were 192 pies in a rupee). When the rupee was decimalised and subdivided into 100 (new) paise, one anna was therefore equivalent to 6.25 paise. The anna was demonetised as a currency unit when India decimalised its currency in 1957, followed by Pakistan in 1961. It was replaced by the 5-paise coin, which was itself discontinued in 1994 and demonetised in 2011.

Anna is derived from the Sanskrit , meaning "food".

There was a coin of one anna, and also half-anna coins of copper and two-anna pieces of silver. With the rupee having been valued to 1s 6d and weighing 180 grains as a 916.66 fine silver coin, the anna was equivalent to 9/8 d. Hence the 2 anna silver coins were of low weight (22.5 grains = 1.46 g).

Anna-denominated postage stamps were issued during the British Raj by the government of British India as well as by several princely states, and after independence until decimalisation of the currency by India and Pakistan.

Notation
The first number is the number of rupees, the second is the number of annas (1/16), the third is the number of paisas (1/64), and the fourth is the number of pies (1/192). Examples are below.

1-15-3-2 = 1.9947
1-8-3 = 1.546
1-4 = 1.25

Coins

Stamps

See also

Indian coinage
British Indian coins
History of the rupee

References

Historical currencies of India
Coins of India